José Martínez Sánchez (born 11 March 1945), nicknamed Pirri, is a Spanish former footballer. A central midfielder in the early part of his career, he finished up as a sweeper.

He spent the vast majority of his career with Real Madrid, appearing in 561 competitive matches and scoring 172 goals while winning 15 titles. He also served as captain of the club.

A Spanish international for 12 years, Pirri represented the country in two World Cups.

Club career
Born in Ceuta, Pirri signed with Real Madrid in 1964 as a 19-year-old, from Segunda División club Granada CF who received 200 million pesetas. He made his debut with the former on 8 November of that year as a replacement for suspended Ferenc Puskás, in a 4–1 home win against FC Barcelona; late in the same month he scored the first of his 123 goals in La Liga, contributing to a 2–0 home victory over Deportivo de La Coruña also at the Santiago Bernabéu Stadium.

During his tenure for Real, Pirri won ten national championships, netting in double digits in five of those seasons including a career-best 13 goals in 1975–76. He added nine appearances in the 1965–66 European Cup (for a total of 57 with 18 goals in the competition), including the final against FK Partizan (2–1 win in Brussels); he was part of a generation of players of the team dubbed Yé-Yé.

In 1980, Pirri signed for Mexican Liga MX side Puebla FC. He scored his first goal for them on 28 September, in a 2–0 home defeat of Atletas Campesinos.

Pirri retired from the game at the age of 37 due his club's poor economic situation, even though he had one year more running in his contract. He then completed his studies to qualify as a physician, and joined Real Madrid's medical staff; in late December 1999, he was named their general manager after Jorge Valdano (who later replaced him) rejected the offer.

International career
Pirri earned 41 caps for Spain, scoring 16 goals. He made his debut in their 1966 FIFA World Cup opener, netting in the 2–1 loss to Argentina in an eventual group stage exit.

The 33-year-old was also in squad for the 1978 World Cup held in Argentina, playing twice in another group phase elimination.

Style of play
Pirri was well known for his ferocity, leadership skills and versatility. Other than his two main positions, he was also deployed as a makeshift forward.

Pirri played the 1971 European Cup Winners' Cup Final with his arm in a cast, and the decisive game of the 1974 Copa del Rey with fever and a broken clavicle. For his services to Real Madrid, he was only one of two players to have the Laureada being bestowed upon him by president Santiago Bernabéu – the other being Goyo Benito.

Personal life
In 1969, Pirri married Spanish actress Sonia Bruno. In February 2009, he started working as a commentator for Radio Nacional de España's Tablero Deportivo.

Career statistics
Scores and results list Spain's goal tally first, score column indicates score after each Pirri goal.

Honours
Real Madrid
La Liga: 1964–65, 1966–67, 1967–68, 1968–69, 1971–72, 1974–75, 1975–76, 1977–78, 1978–79, 1979–80
Copa del Rey: 1969–70, 1973–74, 1974–75, 1979–80
European Cup: 1965–66

See also
List of La Liga players (400+ appearances)
List of Real Madrid CF records and statistics

References

External links

1945 births
Living people
People from Ceuta
Spanish footballers
Footballers from Ceuta
Association football defenders
Association football midfielders
Association football utility players
La Liga players
Segunda División players
Granada CF footballers
Real Madrid CF players
Liga MX players
Club Puebla players
UEFA Champions League winning players
Spain youth international footballers
Spain amateur international footballers
Spain international footballers
1966 FIFA World Cup players
1978 FIFA World Cup players
Spanish expatriate footballers
Expatriate footballers in Mexico
Spanish expatriate sportspeople in Mexico
Real Madrid CF non-playing staff